Richard England (born 9 July 1981) is an Australian racing cyclist who rides for American continental team . England turned pro in 2005 and is a sprinter. His biggest success to date is winning stage 5 of the 2008 Tour de Georgia ahead of Rory Sutherland and George Hincapie.

Results
2008 - 
 1st, Stage 5, Tour de Georgia
 4th, Stage 1, Tour de Georgia
 8th, Stage 3, Tour de Georgia
 14th, Stage 2, Tour of California
 9th, Stage 1, Jayco Bay Cycling Classic
 7th, Stage 2, Jayco Bay Cycling Classic
 5th, Stage 5, Jayco Bay Cycling Classic
 7th, Overall, Jayco Bay Cycling Classic
 25th, Australian National Championship
2007 - 
 1st, Stage 3, Tour of Tasmania
 1st, Stage 10, Tour of Tasmania
 6th, Stage 7, Tour De Georgia
 Australian Team Pursuit Champion
2006 - 
 Australian Criterium Champion
2005 - 
 1st, Stage 5, Nature Valley Grand Prix
2004	
 1st, Midlands Tour, Australia
2003 	
 Australian Team Pursuit Champion
 Other
 6 Track World Cup Reps, Australia

External links
 Rider profile

1981 births
Cyclists from Melbourne
Australian male cyclists
Australian track cyclists
Living people